Sixpence may refer to:

Currency
Sixpence (British coin)
Sixpence (Irish coin)
Sixpence (Australian), a coin minted in Australia until 1963

Arts, entertainment, and media
 A Song of Sixpence, a 1964 novel by A. J. Cronin 
 "Sing a Song of Sixpence", a children's nursery rhyme
Sixpence None the Richer, an American pop/rock band

Other uses
Flat cap, a rounded cap with a brim, also called a sixpence
Collin Sixpence (born 1974), Zimbabwean sculptor

See also
6D (disambiguation)
Pence (disambiguation)
Penny (disambiguation)